Wulffia is a genus of flowering plants in the sunflower tribe within the daisy family.

 Species
 Wulffia havanensis DC. - Cuba
 Wulffia rubens Alexander - Guyana
 Wulffia sodiroi Hieron. ex Sodiro - Ecuador

 formerly included
see Clibadium Hymenostephium Melanthera Tilesia 
 Wulffia angustifolia - Melanthera angustifolia
 Wulffia debilis - Hymenostephium debile
 Wulffia macrocephala - Tilesia macrocephala 
 Wulffia sodiroi - Clibadium eggersii

plus several names now considered synonyms of Tilesia baccata

References

Heliantheae
Asteraceae genera
Taxa named by Noël Martin Joseph de Necker